Fernand Auguste Henri Marius Vandernotte (12 July 1902 – 20 January 1990) was a French rower who competed in the 1932 Summer Olympics and in the 1936 Summer Olympics.

He was born in Tillières. He was the elder brother of Marcel Vandernotte and the father of Noël Vandernotte. In 1932 he was eliminated with his brother Marcel in the repechage of the coxed pair event. Four years later he won the bronze medal as crew member of the French boat in the coxed four competition.

References

1902 births
1990 deaths
French male rowers
Olympic rowers of France
Rowers at the 1932 Summer Olympics
Rowers at the 1936 Summer Olympics
Olympic bronze medalists for France
Olympic medalists in rowing
Medalists at the 1936 Summer Olympics
European Rowing Championships medalists
20th-century French people